Guille Garcia Rodiles (born November 1947) is a Cuban-born American percussionist, singer, and songwriter. He played congas and drums with the jazz rock band Chicago and toured with them in 1973 before being replaced by future full-fledged member Laudir de Oliveira. He has also collaborated with bands and singers such as Manassas and Stephen Stills, Captain Beyond, Bill Wyman, Robert Lamm, Bonnie Koloc, John Lennon, Ringo Starr, Stevie Wonder, and Joe Walsh from The Eagles.

References

 All Music (in English). Retrieved 28 March 2016.
 Chicago VII(in English). Retrieved 28 March 2016
 Rodiles tocará en concierto pro oposición cubana(in Spanish). Retrieved 5 September 2014
 Guille Garcia(in Spanish) Retrieved 28 July 2014
 Guillermo García Rodiles en El Espejo - América TeVé (in Spanish) Retrieved 28 March 2016

External links

Official Rodiles website

1947 births
Living people
American male singer-songwriters
American percussionists
American people of Cuban descent
American singer-songwriters